Mastax formosana is a species of beetle in the family Carabidae with a restricted distribution in Taiwan.

References

Mastax formosana
Beetles described in 1912
Beetles of Asia